In Search of the Castaways is a 1962 American adventure film starring Maurice Chevalier and Hayley Mills in a tale about a worldwide search for a shipwrecked sea captain. The film was produced by Walt Disney Productions and directed by Robert Stevenson from a screenplay by Lowell S. Hawley, based upon Jules Verne's 1868 adventure novel Captain Grant's Children.

In Search of the Castaways was the third of six films Hayley Mills starred in at Disney.

Plot
In Britain in 1858, Professor Paganel (Maurice Chevalier), a scientifically thinking French geography professor, finds a bottle containing a note which he believes to have been written by the missing Captain John Grant (Jack Gwillim). Paganel and Grant's two teenaged children, Mary (Hayley Mills) and Robert (Keith Hamshere), approach John Glenarvan (Michael Anderson Jr.) and his father, the wealthy shipping magnate Lord Glenarvan (Wilfrid Hyde-White), the owner of Captain Grant's ship, and persuade them to finance a search expedition. The expedition sets sail and ventures halfway around the world to South America.

In the Andes, an earthquake sends them down a mountain on a glacier. A giant condor snatches up Robert but Thalcave (Antonio Cifariello), an Indian chief, rescues him. He later claims to know the whereabouts of Captain Grant. After surviving a tidal wave and a lightning storm, the group discovers that the well-meaning Thalcave was mistaken. Meanwhile, a budding romance develops between young Mary Grant and Lord Glenarvan's son John.

They then depart for Australia, where Paganel feels sure they will find Captain Grant. In Melbourne they meet a treacherous gunrunner, Thomas Ayerton (George Sanders), who produces evidence that Captain Grant is in New Zealand. Unaware that Ayerton is the third mate who caused a mutiny on Grant's ship, the search party once more sets sail. Ayerton causes another mutiny and sets the group adrift. They are captured by Maori cannibals, and are imprisoned along with Captain Grant's shipmate, Bill Gaye (Wilfrid Brambell), who helps them escape to a volcano. They evade their pursuers by starting an avalanche which triggers an eruption.

They finally find Captain Grant, overcome Ayerton and his mutineers, and sail for home. As they all sit around talking, the note that Professor Paganel initially found (and that was supposedly in Captain Grant's handwriting) is brought up. Captain Grant states that he never wrote any note, to which Bill says: "The voice be the voice of a God-fearing man. But the hands are the hands of a forger", implying that he imitated Captain Grant's handwriting and wrote the note himself. In the final scene, the Professor points out John and Mary stargazing out at the railing, clearly falling for one another.

Cast

 Maurice Chevalier as Jacques Paganel
 Hayley Mills as Mary Grant
 George Sanders as Thomas Ayerton
 Wilfrid Hyde-White as Lord Glenarvan
 Michael Anderson as John Glenarvan
 Keith Hamshere as Robert Grant
 Antonio Cifariello as Thalcave, the Indian Chief
 Wilfrid Brambell as Bill Gaye
 Jack Gwillim as Captain Grant
 Inia Te Wiata as Maori Chief
 Ronald Fraser as Guard at Dockyard Gate
 Norman Bird as Senior Yacht Guard
 George Murcell as Ayerton's Assistant
 Mark Dignam as Rich Man at Yacht Party
 Michael Wynne as Crooked Sailor
 David Spenser as South American Guide
 Milo Sperber as Crooked Sailor
 Roger Delgado as Patagonian Prisoner
 Barry Keegan as Irish Claimant 
 Maxwell Shaw as Sailor
 Andreas Malandrinos as Crooked Sailor

Production
The film was originally called The Castaways. It was devised by Disney specifically as a vehicle for Hayley Mills, who was under contract to the studio to make a film a year for five years. Disney wanted to age her gradually on screen and she would have her first case of "puppy love" in the film. Disney wanted Mills' brother Jonathan to play her brother on screen but his school teachers turned it down.

In April 1961, Disney announced they would make the film with Mills and Charles Laughton with Hugh Attool to produce and Robert Stevenson to direct. Maurice Chevalier then came on board with production to begin in June. The role of Mills' brother went to Keith Hamshere, who played the lead in Oliver! on stage.

Laughton ended up dropping out of the film. In January 1962, he was diagnosed with the cancer which caused his death in December.

Principal photography was at Pinewood Studios in England. Disney said this was done because Mills' contract "calls for alternating her pictures here and there each year".

Musical numbers
Songs composed by the Sherman Brothers include "Castaway", "Merci Beaucoup", "Let's Climb (Grimpons)" and "Enjoy It", with an orchestral arrangement of "Castaway" serving as the film's overture.

Maurice Chevalier later sang the Sherman Brothers' theme song "The Aristocats" from Disney's 1970 animated film The Aristocats.

Reception

Box office
In Search of the Castaways was a commercial success. Upon its initial release, it earned $4.9 million in North American theatrical rentals. It was one of the 12 most popular movies at the British box office in 1963.

Critical
The New York Times declared: "It is, as we say, a whopping fable, more gimmicky than imaginative, but it doesn't lack for lively melodrama that is more innocent and wholesome than much of the stuff the children see these days on television".

A review in Variety said: "Walt Disney has come up with another splendid piece of spectacular hokum, lavishly coloured and packed with incident and special effects. It can hardly fail to appeal to all types of audience, though apparently aimed mainly at the moppets".

The Monthly Film Bulletin wrote: "Well timed for Christmas, this film is designed to keep the family wide awake after the plum-pudding, when the critical faculties are not too sharp. Attention is discreetly drawn away from the rather cardboard characters, and the Fauntleroy smile of Michael Anderson, by a kaleidoscope of colour and movement".

See also
List of American films of 1962
List of films set in New Zealand

References

External links 
 
 
 
 

1962 films
1962 adventure films
1960s children's films
1960s children's adventure films
American children's films
Walt Disney Pictures films
1960s musical films
Films about castaways
1960s English-language films
Films based on French novels
Films based on fantasy novels
Films based on children's books
Films based on works by Jules Verne
Films directed by Robert Stevenson
Films set in Scotland
Films set in South America
Films set in New Zealand
Films set in Australia
Films set in the 1850s
Films set in 1858
Films shot at Pinewood Studios
Seafaring films
Films adapted into comics
Films produced by Walt Disney
1960s American films